Padai Soozha is a 2011 Indian Tamil language masala film directed by A. S. Prabhu. The film stars newcomer Ganesh Prasad and Varshini, with newcomer Abhinay, newcomer Sangeetha, Prasad Raj, Siddique, R. Sundarrajan, Mahanadi Shankar, Sakthivel, Manikandan and Chinrasu playing supporting roles. The film had musical score by N. Sasikumar and was released on 25 March 2011.

Plot
The film begins with Shiva (Ganesh Prasad) being attacked by rowdies and he is admitted at the hospital in a serious condition.

In the past, the college students Shiva and Ashok (Abhinay) are archenemies but after the college election, they made peace and became good friends. Shiva and Saranya (Varshini) were in love while Ashok and Swetha (Sangeetha) fell in love with each other. Ashok and Swetha secretly married at the registrar office with the help of Shiva and Saranya. Ashok and Swetha then stayed in a house owned by a kind-hearted man (R. Sundarrajan). The local don Adhikesavan wanted to grab their land and killed the innocent Ashok. Shiva and his friends complained to the police inspector and the local politician but they did nothing because they worked for Adhikesavan. Shiva and his friends then protested against Adhikesavan in the street and the police arrested them. The district collector Siddique (Siddique) decided to help them and asked them to provide evidence of Adhikesavan's criminal activities. Shiva then sabotaged all his business. Adhikesavan suspected his archenemy Kasi (Mahanadi Shankar) of doing so and he brutally killed him in broad daylight. Meanwhile, Swetha gave birth to a baby boy. Adhikesavan found out about Shiva's plans, he killed his friends and Adhikesavan's henchmen attacked Shiva.

Back to the present, Shiva takes revenge on Adhikesavan by beating his son Mahesh (Manikandan) in front of him until he becomes mentally ill.

Cast

Ganesh Prasad as Shiva
Varshini as Saranya
Abhinay as Ashok
Sangeetha as Swetha
Prasad Raj as Adhikesavan
Siddique as Siddique
R. Sundarrajan as House owner
Mahanadi Shankar as Kasi
Sakthivel as Police inspector
Manikandan as Mahesh
Chinrasu as Chandru
Kumar
Anju Mohan
Ramesh
R. John Peter
Nagina in a special appearance

Production
A. S. Prabhu made his directorial debut with Padai Soozha under the banner of AGR Right Films. Newcomer Ganesh Prasad (Vijjith), who hailed from Coimbatore, was cast to play the hero while Varshini was chosen to play the heroine. Prasad Raj, the brother of actor Prakash Raj, was selected to play the villain.

Soundtrack

The soundtrack was composed by N. Sasikumar. The soundtrack, released in 2010, features 5 tracks.

Reception
A reviewer said, "Padai Soozha is a tragedy of a movie, the type that would send the audience racing for the nearest exit. Meaningless script, poor dialogues, artificial backdrops, and the absence of any form of entertainment makes Padai Sooza a can't watch".

References

2011 films
Indian drama films
2010s Tamil-language films
2010s masala films